Mariano González Maroto (born 27 October 1984), commonly known as Nano, is a Spanish professional footballer who plays as a left-back or midfielder for Lincoln Red Imps in the Gibraltar National League.

Club career

Spain
Born in Málaga, Andalusia, Nano spent the vast majority of his first six years as a senior in the lower leagues and amateur football, representing UD Fuengirola Los Boliches, UD Marbella, FC Barcelona Atlètic, Córdoba CF, UE Lleida and FC Cartagena. The exception to this occurred during the 2005–06 season, when he totalled only 198 minutes in the Segunda División for Gimnàstic de Tarragona to help them to promote to La Liga.

Nano returned to the second division in the 2009–10 campaign, being relatively played by Cádiz CF but suffering relegation. He scored his first goal as a professional on 4 October 2009, in a 1–0 away win against Albacete Balompié.

After two years back in division three, with Real Oviedo, Nano returned to the second tier by signing for SD Ponferradina. He only missed one game in 42 in his only season, adding two goals to help the club avoid relegation one year after promoting.

Panathinaikos
In the summer of 2013, after refusing to show up for training, Nano joined Panathinaikos F.C. from Greece. He made his debut in top-flight football on 18 August of that year, featuring the full 90 minutes in a 2–0 home victory over Panetolikos F.C. in the Super League and converting a three-minute penalty kick in the process.

Nano extended his contract to Pana on 8 December 2014, until 2017. During his spell in Athens, he was successively reconverted into a left-back.

Return to Spain
On 25 August 2016, Nano signed a two-year deal with Spanish second division team UD Almería.

Honours
Cartagena
Segunda División B: 2008–09

Panathinaikos
Greek Football Cup: 2013–14

Individual
Super League Greece Team of the Year: 2013–14

References

External links

1984 births
Living people
Spanish footballers
Footballers from Málaga
Association football defenders
Association football midfielders
Segunda División players
Segunda División B players
Divisiones Regionales de Fútbol players
UD Fuengirola Los Boliches players
Marbella FC players
Gimnàstic de Tarragona footballers
FC Barcelona Atlètic players
Córdoba CF players
UE Lleida players
FC Cartagena footballers
Cádiz CF players
Real Oviedo players
SD Ponferradina players
UD Almería players
Recreativo de Huelva players
Super League Greece players
Panathinaikos F.C. players
Gibraltar Premier Division players
Gibraltar National League players
St Joseph's F.C. players
Lincoln Red Imps F.C. players
Spanish expatriate footballers
Expatriate footballers in Greece
Expatriate footballers in Gibraltar
Spanish expatriate sportspeople in Greece
Spanish expatriate sportspeople in Gibraltar